National Highway 734 (NH 734) is a  National Highway in India.

References

National highways in India